A tennis ball is a ball designed for the sport of tennis. Tennis balls are fluorescent yellow in organised competitions, but in recreational play can be virtually any color. Tennis balls are covered in a fibrous felt which modifies their aerodynamic properties, and each has a white curvilinear oval covering it.

Specifications

Modern tennis balls must conform to certain criteria for size, weight, deformation, and bounce criteria to be approved for regulation play. Balls must have masses in the range . Yellow and white are the only colors approved by the ITF, and most balls produced are a fluorescent yellow known as "optic yellow", first introduced in 1972 following research demonstrating they were more visible on television.

Tennis balls are filled with air and are surfaced by a uniform felt-covered rubber compound. The felt delays flow separation in the boundary layer which reduces aerodynamic drag and gives the ball better flight properties. Often the balls will have a number on them in addition to the brand name. This helps distinguish one set of balls from another of the same brand on an adjacent court.

Tennis balls begin to lose their bounce as soon as the tennis ball can is opened. They can be tested to determine their bounce. Modern regulation tennis balls are kept under pressure (approximately two atmospheres) until initially used; balls intended for use at high altitudes have a lower initial pressure, and inexpensive practice balls are made without internal pressurization.

Slower balls

The ITF's "Play and Stay" campaign aims to increase tennis participation worldwide, by improving the way starter players are introduced to the game. The ITF recommends a  progression that focuses on a range of slower balls and smaller court sizes to introduce the game effectively to both adults and children. The slowest balls, marked with red, or using half red felt, are oversized and unpressurized, or made from foam rubber. The next, in orange, are unpressurized normal sized balls. The last, with green, are half pressured normal sized.

History

Lawn tennis, as the modern game was originally known, was developed in the early 1870s as a new version of the courtly game of real tennis. England banned the importation of real tennis balls, playing cards, dice, and other goods in the Exportation, Importation, Apparel Act 1463. In 1480, Louis XI of France forbade the filling of tennis balls with chalk, sand, sawdust, or earth, and stated that they were to be made of good leather, well-stuffed with wool. Other early tennis balls were made by Scottish craftsmen from a wool-wrapped stomach of a sheep or goat and tied with rope. Those recovered from the hammer-beam roof of Westminster Hall during a period of restoration in the 1920s were found to have been manufactured from a combination of putty and human hair, and were dated to the reign of Henry VIII. Other versions, using materials such as animal fur, rope made from animal intestines and muscles, and pine wood, were found in Scottish castles dating back to the 16th century. In the 18th century,  strips of wool were wound tightly around a nucleus made by rolling a number of strips into a little ball. String was then tied in many directions around the ball and a white cloth covering sewn around the ball.

In the early 1870s lawn tennis arose in Britain through the pioneering efforts of Walter Clopton Wingfield and Harry Gem, often using Victorian lawns laid out for croquet. Wingfield marketed lawn tennis sets which included rubber balls imported from Germany. After Charles Goodyear invented vulcanised rubber, the Germans had been most successful in developing air-filled vulcanised rubber balls. These were light and coloured grey or red with no covering. John Moyer Heathcote suggested and tried the experiment of covering the rubber ball with flannel, and by 1882 Wingfield was advertising his balls as clad in stout cloth made in Melton Mowbray. Originally, tennis ball manufacturing was done by cutting vulcanized rubber sheets into a shape similar to that of a three-leaf clover. Before the formation of the rubber into a sphere (which was executed via machinery), chemicals that reacted to produce a gas were added to produce pressure into the hollow inside once the sphere was assembled. The switch to the modem method of joining two hemispheres was done to improve uniformity of wall thickness.

Packaging
Before 1925, tennis balls were packaged in wrapped paper and paperboard boxes. In 1925, Wilson-Western Sporting Goods Company introduced cardboard tubes. In 1926, the Pennsylvania Rubber Company released a hermetically sealed pressurized metal tube that held three balls with a churchkey to open the top. Beginning in the 1980s, plastic (from recycled PET) cans with a full-top pull-tab seal and plastic lid fit three or four balls per can. Pressureless balls often come in net bags or buckets since they do not need to be pressure-sealed.

Disposal

Historically, tennis ball recycling has not existed. Balls from The Championships, Wimbledon are now recycled to provide field homes for the nationally threatened Eurasian harvest mouse.

In literature
The gift of tennis balls offered to Henry in Shakespeare's Henry V is portrayed as the final insult which re-ignites the Hundred Years' War between England and France.

John Webster also refers to tennis balls in The Duchess of Malfi.

References

External links

 International Tennis Federation's history of the rules of the tennis ball 
 ITF Grand Slam Rules:Section I:The Ball 

Balls
Tennis equipment
Spherical objects